"White Horse Neighs in the Western Wind", also translated as "Swordswoman Riding West on White Horse", is a wuxia novella by Jin Yong (Louis Cha). It was first published in 1961 in the Hong Kong newspaper Ming Pao.

Plot 
The plot follows the third edition of the novella. The original serialised version has a different ending, while the characterisations of certain characters such as Old Man Ji have been drastically altered in the revised editions.

Li Wenxiu, a young Han Chinese girl, loses her parents in the Gobi Desert while escaping from a group of bandits who are after a map of Gaochang. Placed on a white steed, she flees to Kazakh territory and is taken into the care of Old Man Ji, an elderly Han Chinese man. While growing up, she meets Supu, a Kazakh boy, and starts a romance with him. However, Supu's father disapproves of the relationship between his son and a Han Chinese girl, so they are forced to separate.

Several years later, Li Wenxiu meets Hua Hui, a hermit, in an oasis in the Gobi Desert, and helps him cure his wounds. Feeling grateful to her, Hua Hui accepts her as his apprentice and teaches her martial arts. She returns home in the midst of heavy snowfall and sees Supu, his father, and his new lover taking shelter in her house. Chen Dahai, the leader of the group of bandits who killed Li Wenxiu's parents, shows up and suspects that the map he has been hunting for is inside the house. He ransacks the house for the map and eventually finds it. The secret of the map is revealed when blood is spilled on the cloth. Chen Dahai wants to silence Supu and the others but Li Wenxiu, who has disguised herself as an old man, intervenes and defeats him.

Chen Dahai flees with the map and finds his way to Gaochang, while Li Wenxiu and Supu gather five others to join them in pursuing Chen and the bandits. The seven of them make their way to Gaochang, where they are surprised to find ordinary items associated with Han Chinese culture instead of treasure and riches as they had expected. To their horror, they encounter a "ghost" who haunts them by killing their companions without leaving any traces. Just as they are about to flee, Supu learns that his lover has been kidnapped by the "ghost" and he tracks the "ghost" to its lair, where he discovers that the "ghost" is actually a martial artist in disguise.

The "ghost" tells his story and reveals that he was forced into exile because he had been betrayed by his apprentice, who is actually Old Man Ji. The "ghost" is the hermit Hua Hui, whom Li Wenxiu saved earlier. To everyone's surprise, Old Man Ji turns out to be actually a man in his 30s in disguise as an old man. Old Man Ji and Hua Hui start fighting with each other. Li Wenxiu is shocked to realise that the two, who are close to her, are actually bitter enemies. Hua Hui eventually dies in his futile attempt to kill everyone in Gaochang. After leaving Gaochang, Li Wenxiu hears the true story behind the items hidden in Gaochang and their origins. She decides to leave Kazakh territory and head to central China as she feels miserable after the loss of two of her loved ones and the marriage of her lover to another woman.

Characters 
 Li Wenxiu is the protagonist.
 Hua Hui, nicknamed "Make Jiangnan Tremble with One Finger", is a hermit who teaches Li Wenxiu martial arts.
 Ma Jiajun is the real name of Old Man Ji, the elderly Han Chinese man who raised the orphaned Li Wenxiu.
 Li San and Shangguan Hong are Li Wenxiu's parents, who are killed at the beginning of the story.
 Supu is a Kazakh boy and Li Wenxiu's childhood playmate. He was originally Li Wenxiu's lover but is later forced by his father to give up on Li due to ethnic prejudice.
 Aman is a Kazakh girl who becomes Supu's new lover.
 Chen Dahai is the leader of the bandits who killed Li Wenxiu's parents.
 "Three Heroes of Lüliang":
 Huo Yuanlong, nicknamed "Divine Saber Trembles Guanxi".
 Shi Zhongjun, nicknamed "Plum Blossom Spear".
 Ding Tong, nicknamed "Two-Headed Snake".

Adaptations 
 In the 1979, Hong Kong's RTV produced a television series based on the story, starring Sharon Yeung as Lei Man Sau.
 In 1982, Taiwan's CTV produced a television series based on the story, starring David Chiang and Kwan Chung.

References 

1961 novels
Novels by Jin Yong
Chinese novellas
Novels first published in serial form
Works originally published in Ming Pao
Chinese novels adapted into television series
Novels set in Xinjiang